Caught Inside may refer to:

 Caught Inside (band), a four-member punk band originally from Miami, Florida
 Caught Inside (film), a 2010 Australian thriller directed by Adam Blaiklock
 Caught inside, When a surfer is paddling out and cannot get past the breaking surf to the safer part of the ocean